Dr. Rogelio Pina Estrada is a Cuban retired attorney who was a member of the World Scout Committee of the World Organization of the Scout Movement from 1949 until 1951.

He was married to Evangelina Perez and they had two daughters, Rosa Pina Perez who married Dr. Arturo Torres Viera and Mercedes Pina Perez who married Fernando Busto Sanchez. Dr. Pina later married Guillermina Enriquez. His legal office was located on Compostela Street in Old Havana.

See also

Asociación de Scouts de Cuba

References

 Anuario Social de La Habana 1939, (Luz-Hilo, S.A.) 
 Directorio Social de La Habana 1948, (P. Fernandez y Cia, S. en C.) 
 Libro de Oro de la Sociedad Habanera 1949, (Editorial Lex) 
 Libro de Oro de la Sociedad Habanera 1950, (Editorial Lex) 
 Registro Social de La Habana 1958, (Molina y Cia, S.A.) 

World Scout Committee members
Year of birth missing
Possibly living people
Scouting and Guiding in Cuba
Place of birth missing (living people)